The Daraa Military Council was a rebel coalition active in Daraa Governorate. The Daraa MC was the dominant rebel organization in Daraa Governotate in 2012, the year it was created. The group's leader, the defected Syrian Air Force colonel Ahmad Al-Nemeh who succeeded in uniting rebel groups in the province, was arrested by al-Nusra Front on 4 May 2014 and put on trial before a Sharia court.

See also
List of armed groups in the Syrian Civil War

References

Anti-government factions of the Syrian civil war
Free Syrian Army